was a town located in Higashiyatsushiro District, Yamanashi Prefecture, Japan.

As of 2003, the town has an estimated population of 5,632 and a population density of 267.94 persons per km². The total area is 21.02 km².

History 
On March 1, 2006, Nakamichi, along with the northern part of the village of Kamikuishiki (the localities of Furuseki and Kakehashi) (from Nishiyatsushiro District), was merged into the expanded city of Kōfu.

External links
 Kōfu official website 

Dissolved municipalities of Yamanashi Prefecture
Kōfu, Yamanashi